Lansing Kill is a river in Oneida County in the state of New York. Pixley Falls is a waterfall located on Lansing Kill by Hurlbutville. Lansing Kill flows through Pixley Falls State Park and it flows parallel to the old Black River Canal for much of its course.

References 

,

Rivers of Oneida County, New York
Mohawk River